The 1955 Kent State Golden Flashes football team was an American football team that represented Kent State University in the Mid-American Conference (MAC) during the 1955 college football season. In their tenth season under head coach Trevor J. Rees, the Golden Flashes compiled a 6–2–1 record (4–1–1 against MAC opponents), finished in third place in the MAC, and outscored all opponents by a combined total of 184 to 87.

The team's statistical leaders included fullback Mike Norcia with 600 rushing yards, Bob Stimac with 428 passing yards, and Ken Redin with 102 receiving yards.  Norcia was selected as a first-team All-MAC player.

Schedule

References

Kent State
Kent State Golden Flashes football seasons
Kent State Golden Flashes football